Edward Long Fox (26 April 1761 – 1835) was an English psychiatrist. He established an insane asylum at Brislington House, near Bristol, England, and classified the patients according to social class as well as behavioural presentation.

He was a member of the Fox family of Falmouth, one of the 11 children of Joseph Fox (1729–1784) and Elizabeth Hingston, his wife. He graduated and MD from the University of Edinburgh in 1784. Following the death of John Till Adams in 1786 he cared for many of Till Adams patients in the local Quaker community. Around the same time he joined Bristol Infirmary as a physician. He worked there for 30 years.

In 1830, he purchased Knightstone Island in Weston-super-Mare to create a therapeutic spa with a range of hot, cold and chemical baths.

Family
Twice married, Fox had 15 daughters and 8 sons.

References

English psychiatrists
19th-century English medical doctors
1761 births
1835 deaths

Alumni of the University of Edinburgh